George Mack (born July 21, 1968 in Hollywood, California) is a former Indy Racing League driver. He is the older brother of Indy Pro Series and short track racer Lloyd Mack.

Mack was the second African-American after Willy T. Ribbs to drive in the Indianapolis 500 when he did so in 2002 and finished 17th. He contested the rest IRL season for 310 Racing and finished 16th in series points with a best finish of 13th. After being unable to find a ride in open wheel cars after 310 Racing folded, he shifted his focus to NASCAR and was named the 3rd driver of the Curry Racing entry in the Truck Series in early 2006, possibly as a part of the Drive for Diversity program. However, Mack denied association with Curry Racing stating that he was not contracted and/or scheduled to drive for Curry Racing.

Mack appeared in an episode of the reality TV show, Blind Date where he dated a girl who referred to herself as Q, a reference to the James Bond character.

Racing record

American Open Wheel
(key)

IndyCar results

References

External links

1971 births
Living people
African-American racing drivers
African-American IndyCar Series drivers
IndyCar Series drivers
Indianapolis 500 drivers
Racing drivers from Los Angeles
People from Hollywood, Los Angeles
21st-century African-American sportspeople
20th-century African-American sportspeople